Yennifer Ramos López (born 4 March 1999), known as Yenifer Ramos, is a Cuban footballer who plays as a midfielder. She has been a member of the Cuba women's national team until October 2018, when she defected while being in Edinburg, Texas, United States during an international competitive tournament.

International career
Ramos capped for Cuba at senior level during the 2018 CONCACAF Women's Championship (and its qualification).

References

1999 births
Living people
Defecting Cuban footballers
Cuban women's footballers
Cuba women's international footballers
Women's association football midfielders
21st-century Cuban women